John Egan (16 March 1951 – 1 July 2007) was a former Dublin GAA county chairman. Also known as Seán Mac Aogáin, he was also active in the promotion of the Irish language. He was elected to the chair of Dublin's county board in 1998 and served as chairman until 2002 and was a member of Clan na nGael GAA club in Ringsend, County Dublin. Egan was also the principal of Haddington Road Boys' National School in County Dublin. Egan died, aged 56, after his bicycle was in collision with a parked car in Enfield, County Meath.

References 

1951 births
2007 deaths
Chairmen of county boards of the Gaelic Athletic Association
Dublin County Board administrators
Heads of schools in Ireland
Irish schoolteachers
Gaelic games players from County Dublin